Cyprus is an island country in the Eastern Mediterranean and the third largest and third most populous island in the Mediterranean. Cyprus is a major tourist destination in the Mediterranean. With an advanced, high-income economy and a very high Human Development Index, the Republic of Cyprus has been a member of the Commonwealth since 1961 and was a founding member of the Non-Aligned Movement until it joined the European Union on 1 May 2004. On 1 January 2008, the Republic of Cyprus joined the eurozone.

Notable firms 
This list includes notable companies with primary headquarters located in the country. The industry and sector follow the Industry Classification Benchmark taxonomy. Organizations which have ceased operations are included and noted as defunct.

See also 
 List of airlines of Cyprus
 List of banks in Cyprus

References 

 
Cyprus